Lazaretta, also called Lazaretto (and alternatively spelled Lazareto), is an uninhabited island close to the northern coast of Crete in the Aegean Sea. It is located near the city of Chania and administratively, it is within the municipality of Chania, in Chania regional unit.
 Lazaretta is a popular destination for swimmers on sightseeing boats from Chania harbour.

See also
List of islands of Greece

Landforms of Chania (regional unit)
Uninhabited islands of Crete
Islands of Greece